The HTC Atlas (also known as the HTC P4351) is an Internet-enabled Windows Mobile Pocket PC smartphone designed by HTC of Taiwan. It has a touchscreen with a right-side slide-out QWERTY keyboard. The Atlas's functions include those of a camera phone and a portable media player in addition to text messaging and multimedia messaging. It also offers Internet services including e-mail, instant messaging, web browsing, and local Wi-Fi connectivity. It is a quad-band GSM phone with GPRS and EDGE. It is the successor to the HTC Herald (also known as the HTC P4350).

References 

Atlas
Windows Mobile Professional devices
Year of introduction missing